Drumreilly civil parish is situated partly in the baronies of Carrigallen and Dromahaire, County Leitrim and partly in the barony of Tullyhaw, County Cavan, Ireland.

Etymology

The name of the parish derives from Drumreilly townland in the parish, which is an Anglicisation of the Gaelic Druim Air Belaigh meaning 'The Hill-Ridge of the Eastern Road'. The earliest surviving reference to the name is c.800 in the Martyrology of Tallaght, where it is spelled Dromma Airbelaig.

History

The parish is in an area originally called Cenel Luacháin inhabited from early times by the Conmhaícne tribe. The reference above in the Martyrology of Tallaght is to a feast day on 15 January referring to the Seven bishops of Dromma Airbelaig, who probably lived in a monastery in the area in early Christian times.

Townlands

The townlands of Drumreilly civil parish in County Leitrim are:

 
 Achadh
 Aghalough
 Aghawillin
 Aghoo
 Annagh Lower
 Annagh Upper
 Arderry
 Ardunsaghan
 Aughrim
 Boeeshil
 Carntullagh
 Cleighran Beg
 Cleighran More
 Coragh
 Corduff
 Corglass
 Corgloghan
 Cornacreeve
 Cornageeha
 Cornaguillagh
 Cornamucklagh North
 Cornamucklagh South
 Corrala
 Corralahan
 Corraleehan
 Corramahan
 Corrawaleen
 Cortober
 Crockawaddy
 Crockeen
 Cuilmore
 Cuilta
 Cully
 Curraghatawy
 Derradda
 Derreenageer
 Derrinivver
 Derrinwillin
 Derrygoan
 Derrynahona
 Doochorran
 Drumahira
 Drumarigna
 Drumconlevan
 Drumcoura
 Drumcullion
 Drumderg
 Drumdiffer
 Druminalass
 Drumlea
 Drumnafinnila
 Drumnafinnila Barr
 Drumreilly
 Drumristin
 Eden
 Fahy
 Garadice
 Glebe
 Gortachoosh
 Greaghnafarna
 Greaghnaloughry
 Gubs
 Inishmacgrath
 Keelrin
 Keenheen
 Kilgarriff
 Killameen
 Killaphort
 Kilmore
 Kilnacreevy
 Knocks
 Largandill
 Leckan
 Leganamer
 Lisgruddy
 Lislahy
 Lisroughty
 Mullaghboy
 Mullaghmore
 Slievenakilla
 Sradrinagh
 Sradrinan
 Sraloaghan
 Sranadarragh
 Sranagarvanagh
 Stroke
 Toome
 Tullynahaia
 Tullynapurtlin
 Tullyveacan
 Urbal
 Urbal Barr
 Whiterock

The townlands of Drumreilly civil parish in County Cavan are:
 
 Ardmoneen
 Corraleehanbeg
 Doon (Drumreilly)
 Garryfliugh
 Knockfin
 Moher (Drumreilly)

References

Church organization
Church of Ireland parishes in the Republic of Ireland